Lorenzo M. Boardman (c. 1832 - July 16, 1897) was an American architect. Born in Pennsylvania, he was an architect in Minneapolis, Minnesota for three decades. He spent the last ten years of his life in Spokane, Washington, where he designed many buildings, including the Traders Block, Temple Court, the Ross Block, and the Windsor Block. He also designed the NRHP-listed Whitten Block.

References

1830s births
1897 deaths
Architects from Minneapolis
Architects from Pennsylvania
People from Spokane, Washington
Architects from Washington (state)
19th-century American architects